Mohammad Iqbal Omar Al Saydali (born 28 January 1972) is an Iraqi politician, formerly Iraq's education minister, was born 28 January 1972, in the northern Iraqi city of Mosul.

Specialized Certificates
 "issest.prof" Date obtained: 1 September 2008 "University: Mosul College": Basic Education Department: Education.
 Certificate of Mastery in 1999: Specialization: Arts in Education / University of Baghdad Faculty of Education / Department of Educational and Psychological Sciences.
 Distinguished on the certificate of the degree of excellence (first) in 2004: Specialization: Philosophy in Education / University of Baghdad Faculty of Education / Department of Educational and Psychological Sciences.

Career progression
 Professor of the Faculty of Basic Education / University of Mosul 3 December 2000 – now.
 Activities of faculty members at the college / university / other level. Membership of committees in the college.
 Chairman of Scientific Committee in the Department of Education.
 Course of Education Department. 
 Member of the Graduate Studies Committee at the College.
 Representative of Teachers Syndicate in the College.
 Representative of teachers in the College Council.
 Member of the reconstruction committee at the college.
 Member of the Disciplinary Committee at the College.
 Member of the examination committee in the department.
 Member of Teachers Syndicate.
 Founding member of the Association of University Teachers.

References

External links
Official website(Iraqi Minister of Education)
 Official website(Ministry of Education)
 Twitter Profile)

1972 births
Living people
Academic staff of the University of Mosul
Iraqi politicians
Education ministers of Iraq